The Malton and Driffield Junction Railway, later known as the Malton and Driffield branch was a railway line in Yorkshire that ran between the towns of Malton, North Yorkshire and Driffield in the East Riding of Yorkshire.

The line opened on 13 April 1853. It became part of the North Eastern Railway (1854), then London and North Eastern Railway (1923), becoming part of British Railways in 1948. Passenger services on the line gained the nickname the Malton Dodger.

Between the 1920s and 1950s the line saw use transporting chalk from the Burdale and Wharram quarries. Passenger services ended in 1950; the Burdale quarry closed in 1955, and the line closed in 1958.

A short section of the original line reopened in 2015 as a heritage attraction operating as the Yorkshire Wolds Railway. There are plans to further extend the heritage railway.

History

The Malton and Driffield Junction Railway (1846–1870)
Promotion of a line between Malton and Driffield dates to at least the mid 1840s when George Hudson subscribed £40,000 towards a Malton and Driffield Junction Company, which was intended to link to a proposed branch of the Great North of England Railway from Thirsk to Malton.  The Malton and Driffield Junction Railway was promoted as part of a line of communication from Hull to Newcastle-upon-Tyne and beyond to Scotland as well as opening up the agricultural districts of the East Riding of Yorkshire, and providing a short route to the new seaside resorts on the East Yorkshire coast. A connection via the proposed Thirsk and Malton Railway was required for the connections northward. Both the Newcastle and Darlington Junction Railway (N&DJR) and York and North Midland Railways (Y&NMR) supported the scheme.

A previous scheme from Thirsk to Driffield, the Hull, Malton and Northern Union Railway was resurrected and promoted in opposition, but was unsuccessful. An act empowering the construction of a  line was enacted in June 1846, allowing £240,000 to be raised for its development through shares, and a further £80,0000 through loans.

Part of the rationale for the line was a connection to the Thirsk and Malton Railway, which the Newcastle and Darlington Junction had obtained an act for (1846) but not built. A case was brought against that company's successor the York, Newcastle and Berwick Railway (YN&BR) to complete the line. As a result, a second act was obtained with the work completed 1853. The Malton and Driffield company subscribed £35,000 towards the scheme with the YN&BR contributing the other part. In the same time period (1850s) the York and North Midland Railway held £40,000 worth of shares in the M&DJR.

Construction

The engineer was John Cass Birkinshaw, the assistant engineer Alfred Lamert Dickens. In addition to the mainline from New Malton (on the York and Scarborough Railway) to Great Driffield (on the Hull and Selby Bridlington branch) the plans included a  branch from Frodingham Bridge on the River Hull.

The first  of the line from Malton included severe gradients, ascending, including  at 1 in 70, and required heavy civil engineering works. The highest point of the line was within the tunnel, where the southbound gradient changed from 1 in 70 up to 1 in 85 down. As built the line included a number of timber bridges, and a timber viaduct at Wharram. Land had been acquired for a double track line but only a single track was laid, using  weight rails, on cross sleepered track. The line was to be worked by the York, Newcastle and Berwick Railway, under the same rules as the Thirsk and Malton Line.

Work on the line began in 1847, and by 1849 over £100,000 had been expended on the construction of the line, the majority on works (£52,921) and permanent way (£31,597). The bursting of the speculative bubble of the Railway Mania in the late 1840s adversely affected the line's prospects. By early 1849 the company's calls on shares were in arrears.

Financial problems caused the company to abandon the construction of a double track line and only construct a single line.  In 1850 the company applied to parliament to alter the path of the line; the amendment act was passed in 1851.

By 1851 about half of the line had been completed as a single line; the  branch was by then in abeyance. In early 1852 the calls on shares were still in arrears requiring the company to funds by loans. An estimated £65,000 was required for the completion of the line; £40,000 had been borrowed by late January 1852; over £55,000 by mid 1852.

Agreement was reached with the Y&NMR to pay a fee to use the station and track into Driffield. The  was opened formally 19 May 1853, becoming open to public traffic on 1 June. The line had stations at  Settrington, North Grimston, Wharram, Burdale, Fimber, Wetwang, and Garton; Malton station and Driffield station were used as termini.

Operations
In the beginning three passenger trains ran in each direction Mondays to Saturdays, calling at all stations, with two on Sundays. By the end of the 19th century the Sunday service had ceased, but the line reached its high water mark with four trains each way each weekday. Thereafter the line ran a notably consistent three trains in each direction calling at all stations, Mondays to Saturdays, until the service was withdrawn in 1953. Some of the services had two coaches, others one, though it was far from rare to add one or more horseboxes in what was and remains racing country. Loadings were good on Saturdays (Market Days) but schoolchildren were the mainstay during the week.

By 1926 two pick-up goods trains ran daily, in opposite directions, with crews swapping trains mid-journey. These were at times very well loaded, but the traffic only declined in the face of road competition. By the end there were only two pick-up goods per week, both poorly loaded. In the words of The Railway Magazine "Two trains a day might have maintained the railway link ... two a week would not."

The line was conceived as part of a through line between Hull and the north east of England. The only hint of such services came with the Summer Saturday Scarborough to Newcastle and Glasgow holiday trains. Running from Scarborough they halted at Malton, attached a pilot engine at the rear, reversed up onto Malton and Driffield metals at Scarborough Road Junction where the pilot was uncoupled. This locomotive then acted as a banker to get the long train moving forwards once again towards , Pillmoor and the East Coast Main Line. These trains used a rich variety of motive power, with even LNER Class A4 4-6-2s on occasions, but most commonly LNER Class V2 2-6-2s. The other service to use the Malton, Scarborough Road Junction then reverse route was the two trains six time per year beginning and end of term specials, one from King's Cross and the other from Liverpool, to Ampleforth College. This lasted until 28 April 1964.

The closest freight traffic to the original concept was chalk from quarries at Burdale and Wharram bound for steelworks on Teesside. This underwent spectacular boom and bust in the 1920s, petering out in the 1950s, which spelled the line's death-knell.

As for through Hull-Tyneside trains, the junction at Driffield tells its own story – it was facing the "wrong way". No source talks of through traffic, even in wartime. The closest thing to through traffic were scenic excursions which used the line as a scenic part of a scenic route or in some cases toured the line's stations' floral displays. Often such trains' locomotives traversed the line tender-first because the trains arrived the "wrong way" from Hull or Doncaster and would resume travelling the "right way" after a second reverse at Malton. Furthermore, no source comments on how it could be that conscientious staff could find the time to keep beautiful gardens.

Two very occasional traffics added to the line's diminishing income: special trains for royalty and enthusiasts, both of which gathered publicity beyond their revenue. The latter were a phenomenon of the 1950s, with the best recorded running along the line (and others) on 2 June 1957 and 23 June 1957. As with the summer Scarborough to Tyneside trains mentioned above, other royal trains touched the north end of the line when making double-reverses to get to events in Ryedale.

Amalgamation 
In the early 1850s The Leeds Northern (LNR), York, Newcastle and Berwick and York and North Midland railways were considering amalgamation, and in 1853 the M&DJR was admitted to that group of companies; and became part of joint traffic agreements.  In 1854 an act of parliament allowing the YN&BR, LNR and Y&NMR companies to amalgamate into a new "North Eastern Railway" (NER) was passed; the association of M&DJR was formally announced at the first meeting of the NER, where, the distribution of income was decided to be based on traffic receipts over the next 5 years; the M&DJR obtained one director of a board of seventeen, and the company ceased to exist as an independent entity from 1 September 1854. In 1863 agreements relating to the merger of the Stockton and Darlington Railway (S&DR) set the Malton section's share of the combined company's profits at 0.29%, a sum which was not sufficient to meet running costs; the company attempted to renegotiate requesting a share of gross revenue, but were denied.

Difficulties and disappointments arising from line were recalled in a scathing article in the Railway News, written on the eve of the consolidation or NER shares:

History 1870–1958
In 1890 a line from Market Weighton was opened, promoted as the Scarborough, Bridlington and West Riding Junction Railway (act passed 1885), and worked by the NER. The line made a junction with the M&DJR at Driffield (Driffield Junction West) just west of the M&DJR's junction with the Hull to Bridlington Line.

As a result of the 1921 Railways Act, in 1923 the line became part of the London & North Eastern Railway (LNER). In 1948 after nationalisation of the railway as a result of the Transport Act 1947  the line became part of the North Eastern Region of British Railways.

In the 1920s the line was used to transport lime (chalk) from the quarry at Wharram  (open 1918–1930) to the iron and steel industry on Teesside; the line handled around 100,000 tons per year.

In 1922 a quarry opened and Burdale for the same purpose which provided work for the line until the quarry's closure in 1955.

The route was closed to passenger traffic on 3 June 1950 but remained open for goods. It reopened to passengers from 12 to 16 February 1953 and again in February 1958 when roads were impassable due to snow.

The line closed completely on 20 October 1958 and was lifted by 1961 except for a short stretch near Scarborough Road Junction to allow trains to access the Malton to Thirsk line.

Legacy
 the track bed remains in evidence as field boundaries, earthworks, and undeveloped ground. Short sections have been reused as footpaths (e.g. near Wharram Percy). At Malton the former line of the railway influences modern street plans such as the rear boundary to Parliament Avenue. A fraction of the former line has been completely developed over such as at the housing development around Bracken Road in Driffield.

 the station buildings survive except at Sledmere and Fimber, and Burdale station. Other extant structures include a crossing keepers cottage at Sledmere, and a brick water tower with iron water tank at Wharram. Rail related buildings exist at the former quarry at Wharram. The Burdale Tunnel portals were bricked up after closure and the interior experienced collapses in the 1970s and 1980s.

Accidents
On 15 September 1948 a passenger train consisting of a tank engine and two coaches travelling  collided at an accommodation crossing with a Ford lorry carrying Poles and Hungarians going to work on a farm. As a result of the lorry running into the path of the train, three of the lorry passengers were killed and six others seriously injured, including the British driver. The train had minimal damage. The inquest recorded that the accident was caused by lack of caution by the lorry driver, noted that the view at the crossing point was very poor, and that the driver may not have heard the train's whistle over the noise of the lorry engine.

Locomotives and rolling stock 

Based on written records and photographic evidence, the following locomotive types are known to have been used on the MDR in the indicated timeframes.

Goods locomotives

Pre-grouping (before 1923)

Pre-nationalisation (1923–1947)

Post-nationalisation (1948–18 October 1958)

Passenger locomotives

Pre-grouping (before 1923)

Pre-nationalisation (1923–1947)

Post-nationalisation (1948–3 June 1950)

Post-nationalisation (1948–1958)

Heritage operation

The Yorkshire Wolds Railway operate on a section of the Malton and Driffield Junction Railway near the village of Fimber. The project has a short demonstration line and an operational industrial diesel locomotive which provides cab rides to visitors. The railway has ambitious plans for expansion, work on which is currently underway.

Gallery

Notes

References

Locations

Sources

Further material

External links

 Chalk quarry and M&DJR at Wharram

 

 
Early British railway companies
Pre-grouping British railway companies
North Eastern Railway (UK)
Closed railway lines in Yorkshire and the Humber
History of North Yorkshire
History of the East Riding of Yorkshire
Railway companies established in 1846
Railway lines opened in 1853
Railway companies disestablished in 1854
1846 establishments in England